Aleppo (Halab) Today is a television news channel, unofficially associated with Syrian opposition.  The channel's broadcast features music and images with a news ticker running at the bottom of the screen that provides important updates to Aleppan citizens.  The channel originally broadcast from Aleppo but later moved its operations to an undisclosed location outside of Syria due to pressure from the government.  The channel broadcasts on Nilesat and online.

Operations
The channel relies on a network of correspondents in and around Aleppo and a staff that works three shifts to provide 24-hour coverage, focusing particularly on military developments in the area.

Staff
Many of the reporters and editors working for the channel have remained anonymous, but some of the known staff include a former editor Samir Kanjo and his replacement Feras Dibbeh.

Funding
According to Dibbeh, the channel's funding comes from anonymous Aleppine businessman.

References

External links

Television channels in Syria
Arabic-language television stations